Honky Tonk Heroes is the eighth collaborative studio album by Conway Twitty and Loretta Lynn. It was released on June 26, 1978, by MCA Records.

Critical reception
Billboard'''s review of the album in the July 8, 1978 issue said, "Twitty and Lynn release their annual duet LP that includes some of the couple's latest singles, plus some new numbers that fans will hear for the first time. Instrumentation is straight country—with a bouncy, prominent bass line, frequent burst of harmonica and a surplus of guitar: lead, bass, rhythm, and steel. Similar talents and philosophies make for a comfortable pairing for Lynn and Twitty, both on stage and on record." The review noted "Ive Already Loved You in My Mind", "How High Can You Build a Fire", "You're the Reason Our Kids Are Ugly", "We've Made It Legal", and "Live It Up" as the best cuts on the album, with a note to album dealers to "expect sales to be consistently strong."

 Commercial performance 
The album peaked at No. 8 on the US Billboard Hot Country LP's chart, becoming the duo's eighth consecutive album to peak in the top 10, as well as their lowest position on the chart at the time. In Canada, the album peaked at No. 2 on the RPM Country Albums chart.

The album's only single, "From Seven Till Ten", was released in June 1978 and peaked at No. 6 on the US Billboard Hot Country Singles chart, the duo's eighth single to peak in the top 10, but also their lowest position on the chart at the time. In Canada, the single peaked at No. 2 on the RPM Country Singles chart.  It was backed with "You're the Reason Our Kids Are Ugly."

 Recording 
Recording sessions for the album took place on March 8, 14 and 15, 1978, at  Bradley's Barn in Mount Juliet, Tennessee. Three songs on the album were from previous recording sessions. "We've Made It Legal" was recorded on March 6, 1973, during a session for 1973's Louisiana Woman, Mississippi Man. Two songs were from sessions for 1977's Dynamic Duo'', "From Seven Till Ten" was recorded on March 15, 1977, and "How High Can You Build a Fire" was recorded on March 16, 1977.

Track listing

Personnel 
Adapted from the album liner notes.
Bobby Bradley – engineer
Harold Bradley – bass
Owen Bradley – producer
Larry Boden – mastering
Carol Lee Cooper – backing vocals
Ray Edenton – rhythm guitar
Johnny Gimble – fiddle
John Hughey – steel guitar
The Jordanaires – backing vocals
Tommy "Porkchop" Markham – drums
Grady Martin – lead guitar
Charlie McCoy – harmonica
Joe Mills – engineer
Bob Moore – bass
The Nashville Sounds – backing vocals
Hargus "Pig" Robbins – piano
L. E. White – backing vocals

Charts

Album

Singles

References 

1978 albums
Loretta Lynn albums
Conway Twitty albums
MCA Records albums